On the Loose! is the only studio album by British pop group Deuce, released in 1995 by London Records. The album includes the singles "Call It Love", "I Need You" and "On the Bible". It peaked at number 18 in the UK Albums Chart.

In Australia, a 2-disc version of the album was released in 1997 which includes the single "No Surrender" added to the original track listing on disc 1 and remixes on disc 2.

Track listing
All tracks written by Phil Harding, Ian Curnow and Rob Kean, except where noted.

Personnel
Adapted from the album's liner notes.

Deuce
 Kelly O'Keefe – vocals
 Lisa Armstrong – vocals
 Craig Young – vocals
 Paul Holmes – vocals

Other musicians
 Tracy Ackerman – backing vocals (tracks 1, 3–5, 7, 8, 10)
 Trevor Connor – backing vocals (tracks 3, 7, 8, 10)
 Tee Green – backing vocals (tracks 4–6, 9, 11)
 The Vocal Assassins (led by Bazil Mead) – choir (track 2)

Production
 Phil Harding – producer
 Ian Curnow – producer
 Rob Kean – producer
 Julian Gallagher – assistant
 Recorded at the CHAPS Studio and the Strongroom
 Simon Fowler – photography
 Design and art direction by Form

References

External links
On the Loose! at Discogs

1995 debut albums
Deuce (band) albums
London Records albums